Stationarius may refer to:

 a type of librarius; see Manuscript culture
 Stationarius (Roman military)